Jean Del Val (born Jean Jacques Gauthier; 17 November 1891 – 13 March 1975) was a French-born actor, also credited as Jean Gauthier and Jean Gautier.

Career
He played roles during the Hollywood silent era, beginning with The Fortunes of Fifi in 1917. During the early days of talkies he served as a translator and vocal coach for French language versions of American-made films. Two of his notable credits include the classic 1942 film Casablanca in a small role as an announcer for a French radio station in one of the opening scenes, and historical figure Ferdinand Foch in the 1941 film Sergeant York, based on the life of Alvin York. His most well-known role was comatose scientist Dr. Jan Benes in the 1966 science fiction film Fantastic Voyage.

He also appeared on 5 episodes of the television series Combat!: first, uncredited in the episode "A Day in June", followed by "No Trumpets, No Drums" as Marceau, then as a French farmer in "Birthday Cake", Father Bomar in "The Steeple", and Brother Edmundo in "The Mockingbird".

Death
Del Val died at age 83 from a heart attack in Pacific Palisades, California. He is interred in the Holy Cross Cemetery, Culver City.

Selected filmography

The Fortunes of Fifi (1917) – Louis Bourcet
Heart's Desire (1917) – Jacques
Atonement (1919) – Tony
The Mystery of the Yellow Room (1919) – Jean Sainclair
A Sainted Devil (1924) – Casimiro
A Man of Iron (1925) – Prince Novakian
Fifty-Fifty (1925) – Jean
Back to Liberty (1927) – Rudolph Gambier
Soyons gais (1930)
The Sap from Syracuse (1930) – Pierre Bouvet – French Engineer (uncredited)
Sea Legs (1930) – Crosseti
Women Men Marry (1931) – Pierre Renault
The Magnificent Lie (1931) – Stage Manager
Friends and Lovers (1931) – Marquis Henri de Pézanne
Possessed (1931) – Waiter (uncredited)
The Passionate Plumber (1932) – Chauffeur
Quand on est belle (1932) – Gensler
L'Athlète incomplet (1932) – Coach
Rasputin and the Empress (1932) – Minor Role (uncredited)
Le plombier amoureux (1932)
Gabriel Over the White House (1933) – Representative at Debt Conference (uncredited)
The Man Who Broke the Bank at Monte Carlo (1935) – Cook (uncredited)
The Phantom Gondola (1936) – Monsieur de Montignac
Block-Heads (1938) – French aviator (uncredited)
Pack Up Your Troubles (1939) – Capt. Armande (uncredited)
The Flying Deuces (1939) – Sergeant
Charlie Chan in City in Darkness (1939) – French Cabby (uncredited)
Everything Happens at Night (1939) – Gendarme Catching Thief (uncredited)
The Man Who Wouldn't Talk (1940) – Jacques (uncredited)
Broadway Melody of 1940 (1940) – Italian Waiter (uncredited)
The House Across the Bay (1940) – French Official (uncredited)
I Was an Adventuress (1940) – Detective (uncredited)
Earthbound (1940) – Train Dispatcher (uncredited)
Brother Orchid (1940) – Frenchman (uncredited)
Mystery Sea Raider (1940) – Captain Benoit
Captain Caution (1940) – French Officer (uncredited)
Triple Justice (1940) – Don Solas (uncredited)
Drums of the Desert (1940) – Colonel Fouchet
Down Argentine Way (1940) – Señor Rufino (uncredited)
Arise, My Love (1940) – Conductor (uncredited)
The Mark of Zorro (1940) – Sentry (uncredited)
Hudson's Bay (1941) – Captain (uncredited)
Rage in Heaven (1941) – Porter at Sanatarium (uncredited)
That Night in Rio (1941) – Stock Exchange Clerk (uncredited)
Hello, Sucker (1941) – Headwaiter (uncredited)
Sergeant York (1941) – Marshal Ferdinand Foch (uncredited)
Outlaws of the Desert (1941) – Faran El Kader
Paris Calling (1941) – Peasant (uncredited)
The Lady Has Plans (1942) – Bartender (uncredited)
Secret Agent of Japan (1942) – Solaire
Take a Letter, Darling (1942) – Headwaiter (uncredited)
The Pied Piper (1942) – Railroad official
Crossroads (1942) – Court Clerk (uncredited)
Just Off Broadway (1942) – Henri – Waiter (uncredited)
Dr. Renault's Secret (1942) – Henri (uncredited)
Gentleman Jim (1942) – Renaud (uncredited)
Casablanca (1942) – Police Officer (uncredited)
Reunion in France (1942) – Porter (uncredited)
Mission to Moscow (1943) – Molotov's Secretary (uncredited)
Action in the North Atlantic (1943) – Capt. La Pricor (uncredited)
Background to Danger (1943) – Clerk (uncredited)
For Whom the Bell Tolls (1943) – The Sniper
Adventures of the Flying Cadets (1943, Serial) – Michaud – Nazi Agent M-7 [Ch. 13] (uncredited)
Wintertime (1943) – Constable (uncredited)
Paris After Dark (1943) – Papa Benoit (uncredited)
The Song of Bernadette (1943) – Estrade (uncredited)
Passage to Marseille (1944) – Raoul Doulaine (uncredited)
Tampico (1944) – Port Pilot (uncredited)
Uncertain Glory (1944) – Prison Turnkey (uncredited)
Irish Eyes Are Smiling (1944) – Waiter (uncredited)
Molly and Me (1945) – Pierre Petard – Cook (uncredited)
Cornered (1945) – M. Trabeau, First Prefect (uncredited)
The Spider (1945) – Henri Dutrelle, Hotel Manager
13 Rue Madeleine (1946) – French Peasant with Wood (uncredited)
Gilda (1946) – French Cartel Member (uncredited)
O.S.S. (1946) – Conductor (uncredited)
Monsieur Beaucaire (1946) – Minister of War (uncredited)
So Dark the Night (1946) – Dr. Manet
The Razor's Edge (1946) – Police Clerk (uncredited)
The Return of Monte Cristo (1946) – Pinot (uncredited)
Undercover Maisie (1947) – Headwaiter (uncredited)
Buck Privates Come Home (1947) – Duprez – French Consul General (uncredited)
The Private Affairs of Bel Ami (1947) – Commissioner
Repeat Performance (1947) – Tony – Waiter (uncredited)
Life with Father (1947) – François – Headwaiter at Delmonico's (uncredited)
Down to Earth (1947) – Croupier (uncredited)
The Foxes of Harrow (1947) – Dr. Le Fevre (uncredited)
The Crime Doctor's Gamble (1947) – Theodore – Butler
I Walk Alone (1947) – Henri the Chef (uncredited)
Julia Misbehaves (1948) – Croupier (uncredited)
Siren of Atlantis (1949) – Minor Role (uncredited)
The Fighting O'Flynn (1949) – French Admiral (uncredited)
The Great Sinner (1949) – Croupier (uncredited)
The Secret of St. Ives (1949) – Count St. Ives
Battleground (1949) – French Peasant Man (uncredited)
Under My Skin (1950) –  Minor Role (uncredited)
Last of the Buccaneers (1950) – Sauvinct (uncredited)
Rich, Young and Pretty (1951) – Headwaiter (uncredited)
Hurricane Island (1951) – Tavern Patron (uncredited)
The Law and the Lady (1951) – Chemin de fer Dealer (uncredited)
Lovely to Look At (1952) – Creditor (uncredited)
Park Row (1952) – Mr. Dessard (uncredited)
The Iron Mistress (1952) – St. Sylvain (uncredited)
The Hitch-Hiker (1953) – Inspector General
The 49th Man (1953) – Agent Maurice Leroux
Gentlemen Prefer Blondes (1953) – Ship's Captain (uncredited)
Little Boy Lost (1953) – Dr. Biroux (uncredited)
Living It Up (1954) – French Chef (uncredited)
The Gambler from Natchez (1954) – Dr. Ratan, Duel Official (uncredited)
The Last Time I Saw Paris (1954) – Doctor (uncredited)
Pirates of Tripoli (1955) – Abu Tala
Moonfleet (1955) – French Captain (uncredited)
Duel on the Mississippi (1955) – Bidault
Anything Goes (1956) – French Luggage Man (uncredited)
Funny Face (1957) – Hairdresser
Silk Stockings (1957) – Elderly Waiter (uncredited)
The Sad Sack (1957) – French General (uncredited)
Me and the Colonel (1958) – Old Gentleman (uncredited)
The Wreck of the Mary Deare (1959) – Javot (uncredited)
Can-Can (1960) – Judge Merceaux
Seven Thieves (1960) – Roulette Croupier (uncredited)
The Devil at 4 O'Clock (1961) – Louis (uncredited)
Take Her, She's Mine (1963) – Concierge (uncredited)
Bedtime Story (1964) – Croupier (uncredited)
Sylvia (1965) – Maitre'd (uncredited)
The Art of Love (1965) – Magistrate (uncredited)
Fantastic Voyage (1966) – Jan Benes
Wait Until Dark (1967) – The Old Man (uncredited)
Darling Lili (1970) – Maitre D' (uncredited)

External links

 
 
 

1891 births
1975 deaths
Actors from Reims
French male silent film actors
French male film actors
Vocal coaches
English–French translators
Burials at Holy Cross Cemetery, Culver City
20th-century French male actors
20th-century translators
French expatriate male actors in the United States